The Kaknäs tower is a telecommunications tower located at Ladugårdsgärdet in Stockholm, Sweden. The tower is a major hub of Swedish television, radio and satellite broadcasts. For a few years Kaknästornet was the tallest building in the Nordic countries until Näsinneula was opened in Tampere, Finland in 1971. It was surpassed in 2005 by the Turning Torso in Malmö. The tower is owned by the national Swedish broadcasting company Teracom. Its name comes from the ancient name of the area, Kaknäs.

The tower used to be open to the public, with an information centre and gift shop, indoor and outdoor observation decks as well as a restaurant, but has now been permanently closed to the public since 2018 on the grounds that the security repairs would have become too expensive. It was later revealed that the real cause is the threat of foreign intelligence. The fear is that a foreign power would seek to take control of important communication lines and systems of society. According to Swedish television, the Swedish security police have stated in a report in 2017 that the number of foreign intelligence companies has increased and the tower will be closed due to the report.

It is since December 2019 forbidden to photograph, copy, measure or describe the tower without permission.

Popular culture
The tower appears in the SVT1 (a.k.a. Kanal1) ident from 1988.

Gallery

See also
Architecture of Stockholm

References

External links

Information from Visit Stockholm
Information from Teracom 
 

Brutalist architecture in Sweden
Buildings and structures in Stockholm
Communication towers in Sweden
Observation towers in Sweden
Restaurants in Stockholm
Towers completed in 1967
Tourist attractions in Stockholm
Restaurant towers
1967 establishments in Sweden